Daniel Rantzau (1529 – 11 November 1569) was a Danish-German general. He was known for his leadership during the Northern Seven Years' War. For some years, he fought in Germany and Italy, and also took part in the Danish conquest of Dithmarschen in western Holstein during 1559. Rantzau also seems to have been a clear pro-war spokesman before the outbreak of the Northern Seven Years' War with Sweden in 1563.

The Northern Seven Years' War
Rantzau was born at Deutsch-Nienhof  in Schleswig-Holstein. He studied at the University of Wittenberg. A distant relative of Johan Rantzau, Daniel Rantzau was raised in Holstein, and received a solid academic education but preferred a military career. 

At the start of the Northern Seven Years' War, Rantzau was a sub-commander with the rank of colonel but he distinguished himself in some minor struggles during the first fruitless years. In 1565, he was promoted to commander-in-chief, but his position was weak at the start due to a lack of results on the battlefield. However, in December of the same year Rantzau defeated the Swedish army during the Battle of Axtorna, an event which strengthened his position. During the following years, he successfully ravaged Swedish areas and established himself as the most able Danish military leader in spite of the lack of a breakthrough. However, a standing conflict about the pay of the soldiers created serious friction between the Danish noble officers and Peder Oxe, the Steward of the Realm.

From 1567 to 1568, Rantzau carried off what is still considered his main military exploit, his Winter Campaign (Vinterfälttåget) through Småland and Östergötland. During the campaign, he defeated some minor Swedish armies and after having given up an attack on Stockholm, saved his whole army during a risky but successful retreat across the frozen lake Sommen. The campaign had no real military results but shook the Swedish defense. In November 1569, during an attack on Swedish-occupied Varberg Fortress in Halland, Rantzau was killed by a cannonball.

Legacy
Today, although quite overshadowed by his relative Johan Rantzau in public memory, Daniel Rantzau is considered the more brilliant tactician of the two. Military historians in general regard him as one of the few first-rate military leaders of the war from 1563-70.

References

Literature
Dansk Biografisk Leksikon, vol. 11, 1982.
Salmonsens Konversationsleksikon, vol. 19, 1925.

1529 births
1569 deaths
People from the Duchy of Schleswig
University of Wittenberg alumni
16th-century Danish military personnel
Danish military personnel killed in action
Daniel
People of the Northern Seven Years' War